Altenboitzen is a village and today a village within the borough of Walsrode in Heidekreis district in the German state of Lower Saxony. Formerly an independent municipality, it is part of Walsrode since 1974.

Location 
The village lies southwest of the town on the Lüneburg Heath. The Jordanbach stream flows through Altenboitzen and continues in a southwesterly direction before discharging into the River Böhme.

Road names 
Altenboitzen has no road names, only house numbers.

Politics 
The municipal administrator (Ortsvorsteher) is Stephan Rengstorf.

Points of interest 
In 2001 Altenboitzen was voted as one of the most beautiful villages in Lower Saxony in the competition Unser Dorf hat Zukunft ("Our Village Has a Future"). 
The village is on the Verden to Walsrode railway, which was established in 1910, and which is operated by the Verden-Walsroder Eisenbahn company. It was also known as the Jordan-Bomlitz Railway between Bomlitz and Altenboitzen.

External links 
Altenboitzen at www.stadt-walsrode.de
  Map of Walsrode

Heidmark